The 1912 United States presidential election in New Hampshire  took place on November 5, 1912, as part of the 1912 United States presidential election which was held throughout all contemporary 48 states. Voters chose four representatives, or electors to the Electoral College, who voted for president and vice president.

New Hampshire was won by the Democratic nominees, New Jersey Governor Woodrow Wilson and Indiana Governor Thomas R. Marshall. Wilson and Marshall defeated incumbent President William Howard Taft, and his running mate Vice President James S. Sherman and Progressive Party candidates, former President Theodore Roosevelt and his running mate California Governor Hiram Johnson.

Wilson won New Hampshire by a narrow margin of 2.05 points, becoming the first Democratic presidential candidate since New Hampshire native Franklin Pierce in 1852 to win the state or populous Hillsborough and Strafford Counties. He was the first Democrat since Grover Cleveland in 1892 to carry any of New Hampshire's counties, the first since Cleveland in 1888 to carry Merrimack and Rockingham Counties, the first to win Belknap County since Cleveland in 1884, and the first to gain a majority in Grafton County since Winfield S. Hancock in 1880.

Although Taft ended up losing the state, New Hampshire would prove to be his second strongest state with 37.43 percent of the vote after Utah (Taft's sole other win beside neighboring Vermont).

This was the last time until 2008 that a Democratic presidential nominee would carry Carroll County.

Results

Results by county

References

New Hampshire
1912
1912 New Hampshire elections